Melanopleurus is a genus of seed bugs in the family Lygaeidae. There are more than 20 described species in the genus Melanopleurus.

Species
These 21 species belong to the genus Melanopleurus:

 Melanopleurus amnigena (Brailovsky & Barrera, 1984)
 Melanopleurus aureus (Distant, 1893)
 Melanopleurus barrerai Brailovsky, 1979
 Melanopleurus belfragei (Stal, 1874) (redcoat seed bug)
 Melanopleurus bicolor (Herrich-Schaeffer, 1850)
 Melanopleurus bistriangularis (Say, 1831)
 Melanopleurus brevis Brailovsky, 1975
 Melanopleurus complicatus Brailovsky, 1975
 Melanopleurus dearmasi (Alayo, 1973)
 Melanopleurus fuscosus Brailovsky, 1977
 Melanopleurus inflatus Brailovsky, 1979
 Melanopleurus maculicorium Maldonado-Capriles, 1974
 Melanopleurus matucanae (Brailovsky, 1978)
 Melanopleurus nubilus Brailovsky, 1979
 Melanopleurus perplexus Scudder, 1981
 Melanopleurus pyrrhopterus (Stal, 1874)
 Melanopleurus tenor Brailovsky, 1979
 Melanopleurus tetraspilus Stal, 1874
 Melanopleurus vazquezae Brailovsky, 1979
 Melanopleurus villai Brailovsky, 1979
 Melanopleurus wygodzinskyi (Alayo, 1973)

References

Further reading

 

 

 Slater, Alex. (August 30, 1992). A genus level revision of western hemisphere Lygaeinae (Heteroptera: Lygaeidae) with keys to species. The University of Kansas Science Bulletin 55(1). pp. 21-22. DOI: 10.5962/bhl.part.772

Lygaeidae
Articles created by Qbugbot